Dolichoderus elegans is an extinct species of Eocene ant in the genus Dolichoderus. Described by William Morton Wheeler in 1915, the fossilised remains of the species were found in the Baltic amber.

References

†
Eocene insects
Prehistoric insects of Europe
Fossil taxa described in 1915
Fossil ant taxa